Cheikh Ahmed Baye (also known as Cheikh Ould Baya) is a politician from Mauritania who is serving as President of the National Assembly of Mauritania from 9 October 2018.

Personal life 
He was born in December 1954 in Tiris Zemmour Region. In 2013, he became mayor of Zouérat and became president of Association of Mayors of Mauritania in 2014.

References 

Mauritanian politicians
1954 births
Living people
People from Tiris Zemmour Region